The following is a partial list of the "F" codes for Medical Subject Headings (MeSH), as defined by the United States National Library of Medicine (NLM).

This list continues the information at List of MeSH codes (F03). Codes following these are found at List of MeSH codes (G01). For other MeSH codes, see List of MeSH codes.

The source for this content is the set of 2006 MeSH Trees from the NLM.

– behavioral disciplines and activities

– behavior control

– behavioral sciences
  – behavioral medicine
  – behavioral research
  – ethology
  – genetics, behavioral
  – genetic determinism
  – parapsychology
  – psychiatry
  – adolescent psychiatry
  – biological psychiatry
  – child psychiatry
  – community psychiatry
  – preventive psychiatry
  – forensic psychiatry
  – commitment of mentally ill
  – confidentiality
  – duty to warn
  – insanity defense
  – geriatric psychiatry
  – military psychiatry
  – orthopsychiatry
  – psychoanalysis
  – psychosomatic medicine
  – psycholinguistics
  – neurolinguistic programming
  – psychology
  – adolescent psychology
  – child psychology
  – cognitive science
  – ethnopsychology
  – psychology, clinical
  – psychology, comparative
  – psychology, educational
  – psychology, experimental
  – psychology, industrial
  – time management
  – psychology, medical
  – psychology, social
  – psychopathology
  – psychopharmacology
  – psychophysics
  – psychoacoustics
  – signal detection (psychology)
  – psychophysiology
  – neuropsychology
  – psychoneuroimmunology
  – sexology
  – sex counseling
  – sex education
  – social sciences
  – anthropology
  – sociology
  – sociology, medical
  – sociobiology

– mental health services
  – child guidance
  – community mental health services
  – counseling
  – directive counseling
  – sex counseling
  – emergency services, psychiatric
  – social work, psychiatric

– personality assessment
  – q-sort

– psychiatric somatic therapies
  – convulsive therapy
  – electroconvulsive therapy
  – orthomolecular therapy
  – psychopharmacology
  – narcotherapy
  – psychosurgery

– psychiatric status rating scales
  – Brief Psychiatric Rating Scale
  – mental status schedule

– psychoanalytic interpretation

– psychological techniques
  – electroshock
  – galvanic skin response
  – interview, psychological
  – reaction time
  – refractory period, psychological

– psychological tests
  – aptitude tests
  – intelligence tests
  – stanford-binet test
  – wechsler scales
  – language tests
  – neuropsychological tests
  – bender-gestalt test
  – luria-nebraska neuropsychological battery
  – trail making test
  – personality tests
  – bender-gestalt test
  – personality inventory
  – cattell personality factor questionnaire
  – manifest anxiety scale
  – mmpi
  – test anxiety scale
  – projective techniques
  – ink blot tests
  – holtzman inkblot test
  – rorschach test
  – thematic apperception test
  – semantic differential
  – word association tests
  – psychometrics

– psychotherapy
  – aromatherapy
  – art therapy
  – autogenic training
  – behavior therapy
  – aversive therapy
  – biofeedback (psychology)
  – cognitive therapy
  – desensitization, psychologic
  – implosive therapy
  – relaxation techniques
  – meditation
  – bibliotherapy
  – biofeedback (psychology)
  – color therapy
  – crisis intervention
  – dance therapy
  – gestalt therapy
  – hypnosis
  – suggestion
  – autosuggestion
  – imagery (psychotherapy)
  – music therapy
  – nondirective therapy
  – play therapy
  – psychoanalytic therapy
  – free association
  – transactional analysis
  – psychotherapeutic processes
  – abreaction
  – catharsis
  – association
  – transference (psychology)
  – countertransference (psychology)
  – psychotherapy, brief
  – psychotherapy, multiple
  – psychotherapy, rational-emotive
  – reality therapy
  – socioenvironmental therapy
  – milieu therapy
  – therapeutic community
  – psychotherapy, group
  – couples therapy
  – family therapy
  – marital therapy
  – psychodrama
  – role playing
  – sensitivity training groups
  – residential treatment

– schizophrenic psychology

The list continues at List of MeSH codes (G01).

F04